Filip Burkhardt (born March 23, 1987 in Poznań) is a Polish footballer who plays for FK Toten.

Career

Club
Of a very slight physical presence, Burkhardt made his debut in the Polish Premier League on June 11, 2004. He played for several Polish Ekstraklasa teams like Amica Wronki and Lech Poznań. In 2006, he played on loan in Widzew Łódź. In 2007, he was loaned to Jagiellonia Białystok from Lech Poznan. In June 2008, he signed a contract with Warta Poznań.  In 2009, he moved to Arka Gdynia.

In August 2011, he joined Sandecja Nowy Sącz on a one-year contract.

International
He was a part of Poland national under-19 football team.

Personal life
He is the brother of Marcin Burkhardt.

References

External links
 
 
 

1987 births
Living people
Polish footballers
Amica Wronki players
Lech Poznań players
Widzew Łódź players
Jagiellonia Białystok players
Tur Turek players
Warta Poznań players
Arka Gdynia players
Sandecja Nowy Sącz players
Wisła Płock players
GKS Katowice players
Olimpia Elbląg players
Górnik Łęczna players
ŁKS Łódź players
Bytovia Bytów players
Ekstraklasa players
I liga players
II liga players
Footballers from Poznań
Association football midfielders